Liu Jianye (born 17 June 1987) is a Chinese retired footballer who last played for Heilongjiang Ice City in the China League One.

Club career
Liu Jianye started his football career with Shenyang Ginde in the 2005 league season where he immediately made an impact within the club after making his debut on 30 April 2005 in a 1-0 win against Chongqing Lifan. Throughout the season, he played in 19 league games and scored his first goal against Shanghai Shenhua in a 6-1 loss. His position within the team was cemented the following season when Liu played in a further 25 leagues games for the club and helped them avoid relegation throughout much of the 2006 league season. At the beginning of the 2007 league season, Shenyang moved to Changsha and rename themselves Changsha Ginde; however, despite Liu becoming a vital member of the squad due to his versatility, the next several seasons saw the club become consistent relegation strugglers and were eventually relegated at the end of the 2010 season.

Despite being relegated with Changsha, Liu established himself within the Chinese national team and was quickly transferred to fellow Chinese Super League side Jiangsu Sainty in December 2010 for an undisclosed fee. He was named club captain during the 2011 season and established himself as a pivotal part of the club's backline.

On 25 February 2019, Liu was loaned to League One side Guangdong South China Tiger for the 2019 season.

On 15 January 2023, Liu officially announced his retirement from professional football.

International career
Liu made his debut for the Chinese national team on 18 July 2009 in a 3-1 win against Palestine. He soon was called up to the squad that won the 2010 East Asian Football Championship before he was called up to China's squad for the 2011 AFC Asian Cup in December 2010.

Career statistics
Statistics accurate as of match played 31 December 2020.

Honours

Club
Jiangsu Sainty
Chinese FA Super Cup: 2013
Chinese FA Cup: 2015

International
China PR national football team
East Asian Football Championship: 2010

References

External links
 
 
 Player profile at sohu.com (Chinese)

1987 births
Living people
Footballers from Shenyang
Chinese footballers
China international footballers
2011 AFC Asian Cup players
2015 AFC Asian Cup players
Changsha Ginde players
Jiangsu F.C. players
Guangdong South China Tiger F.C. players
Taizhou Yuanda F.C. players
Chinese Super League players
China League One players
Association football defenders
Association football midfielders